William Rickford (30 November 1768 – 14 January 1854) was an English banker and Whig  politician who sat in the House of Commons from 1818 to 1841.

Rickford was the son of William Rickford who established the Aylesbury Old Bank in 1795. Rickford became the sole proprietor of the bank when his father died in 1803. He ran the bank until he died in 1854.

In 1818, Rickford was elected Member of Parliament (MP) for Aylesbury. He held the seat until 1841.

Rickford died at the age of 85.

Rickford married Mary Vanderhelm, daughter of John Vanderhelm, on 28 September 1791.

References

External links
 

1768 births
1854 deaths
UK MPs 1832–1835
UK MPs 1818–1820
UK MPs 1820–1826
UK MPs 1826–1830
UK MPs 1830–1831
UK MPs 1831–1832
UK MPs 1835–1837
UK MPs 1837–1841
English bankers
Members of the Parliament of the United Kingdom for English constituencies
Whig (British political party) MPs